A. Hari Reddi (born October 20, 1942) is a Distinguished Professor and holder of the Lawrence J. Ellison Endowed Chair in Musculoskeletal Molecular Biology at the University of California, Davis.  He was previously the Virginia M. and William A. Percy Chair and Professor in Orthopaedic Surgery, Professor of Biological Chemistry, and Professor of Oncology at the Johns Hopkins University School of Medicine.  Professor Reddi's research played an indispensable role in the identification, isolation and purification of bone morphogenetic proteins (BMPs) that are involved in bone formation and repair. The molecular mechanism of bone induction studied by Professor Reddi led to the conceptual advance in tissue engineering that morphogens in the form of metabologens bound to an insoluble extracellular matrix scaffolding act in collaboration to stimulate stem cells to form cartilage and bone. The Reddi laboratory has also made important discoveries unraveling the role of the extracellular matrix in bone and cartilage tissue regeneration and repair.

Significant research accomplishments
Professor Reddi discovered that bone induction is a sequential multistep cascade involving chemotaxis, mitosis, and differentiation.  Early studies in his laboratory at the University of Chicago and National Institutes of Health unraveled the sequence of events involved in bone matrix-induce bone morphogenesis.  Using a battery of in vitro and in vivo bioassays for bone formation, a systematic study was undertaken in his laboratory to isolate and purify putative bone morphogenetic proteins.  Reddi and colleagues were the first to identify BMPs as pleiotropic regulators, acting in a concentration dependent manner.  They demonstrated first that BMPs bind the extracellular matrix, are present at the apical ectodermal ridge in the developing limb bud, are chemotactic for human monocytes, and have neurotropic potential.  His laboratory pioneered the use of BMPs in regenerative orthopedics and dentistry.

Education and Mentors
Hari Reddi received his PhD from the University of Delhi in reproductive endocrinology under the mentorship of M.R.N. Prasad. Reddi did postdoctoral work with Howard Guy Williams-Ashman at the Johns Hopkins University School of Medicine.  Reddi was also a student of Charles Brenton Huggins, the winner of the 1966 Nobel Prize with Peyton Rous for the endocrine regulation of cancer.

International Conference of Bone Morphogenetic Proteins
Reddi is the founder of the International Conference on Bone Morphogenetic Proteins (BMPs).  He organized the first conference at the Johns Hopkins University School of Medicine in 1994.  The conference is held every two years rotating between the United States and an international venue.

Awards
Kappa Delta Award for the "Purification, Cloning and Expression of Osteogenin, A Protein Initiator of Bone Differentiation." in 1991.   
Marshall Urist Award for Excellence in Tissue Regeneration Research from the Orthopedic Research Society and the American Academy of Orthopaedic Surgeons. in 1997.  Professor Reddi was the first recipient of the Urist award.
Nicolas Andry Prize award from the Association of Bone and Joint Surgeons in 1999.
Japanese Association for the Promotion of State-of-the-Art in Medicine prize in 2004.
BBVA Foundation Biomedicine Chair in 2007, enabling the attachment of leading international professors to universities in Spain. Professor Reddi was at the University of Malaga working on articular cartilage regeneration.

Books
Ramachandran, G.N., Reddi, A.H. (Eds.), Biochemistry of Collagen. Plenum Press, New York, NY, 1976.

Piez, K.A., Reddi, A.H. (Eds.), Extracellular Matrix Biochemistry. Elsevier, New York, 1984.

Reddi A.H. (Ed.), Extracellular Matrix: Structure and Function. A.R. Liss, New York, 1985.

Habal, M.B. and Reddi, A.H. (Eds.), Bone Grafts and Bone Substitutes. W.B Saunders and Co., Philadelphia, PA, 1992.

Athanasiou, K.A., Darling, E.M., Hu, J.C., DuRaine, G.D., Reddi, A.H., Articular Cartilage, 2nd Edition.  (Hardback), CRC Press, 2017.

References

Biochemistry educators
Bone morphogenetic protein
Tissue engineering